Wu Dacheng (1835–1902) was a Chinese politician, governor, author, artist, and collector during the Qing dynasty.

Life 
Wu grew up in a scholarly home. While living in Suzhou, he succeeded the imperial examination. In the next two decades, he had many jobs and positions. One of the positions included being a Qing officer.

Governor of Hunan 
Dacheng was the governor of Hunan until 1895, when he failed to defend Liaoning from the Japanese forces during the First Sino-Japanese War.

Artworks 

Wu has painted many paintings during his lifetime, including "Fragrant Mountains" and "Mountain and Stream and Rain". He has made 37 jades, which are held in the Suzhou museum. Other works of art created by him include coins, seals, porcelains, paintings scrolls, and hand fans.

References

Further reading

External links 
 A flower and bamboo hand fan made by Wu Dacheng
 Poetic Couplet in Seal Script by Wu Dacheng

Qing dynasty landscape painters
Painters from Suzhou
1835 births
1902 deaths